Sunil Yadav (born 13 December 1991) is an Indian cricketer. He made his List A debut for Maharashtra in the 2011–12 Vijay Hazare Trophy on 22 February 2012. He made his Twenty20 debut for Saurashtra in the 2016–17 Inter State Twenty-20 Tournament on 2 February 2017.

References

External links
 

1991 births
Living people
Indian cricketers
Maharashtra cricketers
Saurashtra cricketers
People from Azamgarh